Giovanni Schillaci (born 3 November 1967) is an Italian former freestyle wrestler who competed in the 1988 Summer Olympics, in the 1992 Summer Olympics, and in the 1996 Summer Olympics.

Personal life
Schillaci lives and works in Messina, the city in which he married the former Italian-Polish Olympian Katarzyna Juszczak (in 1992 as Polish in Judo and in 2004 as an Italian in freestyle wrestling), and together with whom he trains his daughter the judoka Carolina Costa, also she qualified for the 2020 Summer Paralympics.

Achievements

References

External links
 

1967 births
Living people
Olympic wrestlers of Italy
Wrestlers at the 1988 Summer Olympics
Wrestlers at the 1992 Summer Olympics
Wrestlers at the 1996 Summer Olympics
Italian male sport wrestlers
Wrestlers of Gruppo Sportivo Forestale
Mediterranean Games medalists in wrestling
Mediterranean Games gold medalists for Italy
Mediterranean Games bronze medalists for Italy
European Wrestling Championships medalists
World Wrestling Championships medalists
Competitors at the 1987 Mediterranean Games
Competitors at the 1991 Mediterranean Games
Competitors at the 1997 Mediterranean Games
20th-century Italian people
21st-century Italian people